Holme railway station is a former station in Holme, Cambridgeshire.

History
Holme was one of the original stations, opening with the line on 7 August 1850.

On 1 August 1863 Holme became a junction station with the opening of the Ramsey Railway, between Holme and Ramsey.

The Ramsey branch closed to passengers on 6 October 1947, and Holme station closed on 6 April 1959.

Route

References

External links
 Holme station on navigable 1946 O. S. map
 Holme station on Subterranea Britannica

Disused railway stations in Cambridgeshire
Railway stations in Great Britain opened in 1850
Railway stations in Great Britain closed in 1959
Former Great Northern Railway stations